Escape From Reason is a philosophical work written by American theologian and Christian apologist Francis A. Schaeffer, London: InterVarsity Press, first published in 1968. It is Book Two in Volume One of The Complete Works of Francis A. Schaeffer A Christian Worldview. Westchester, IL:Crossway Books, 1982. This is the second book of Francis Schaeffer's "Trilogy." It was written and published after The God Who Is There was written but released before that first book.

Overview
Unlike the first (The God Who Is There), and third (He Is There and He Is Not Silent) works in Schaeffer's "Trilogy", Escape from Reason is only loosely divided into seven chapters.  Instead, each chapter contains a number of small sections, which offer a much clearer division of the prose.  There are 39 such sections in all.

References

 Richard H. Bube. (Review) Journal of the American Scientific Affiliation. Vol 21, June 1969, pp. 54–55
 Alan F. Johnson. (Review) Moody Monthly, Vol 69, June 1969, pp. 96–98.
 P. Lakey. (Review) Gordon Review, Vol 11, Summer 1969, p. 241-245

External links
 Todd Kappelman, "The Need to Read Francis Schaeffer" An overview of Schaeffer's Trilogy from Probe Ministries. Retrieved 25 September 2006.

1968 non-fiction books
Books about Christianity